Judo competitions at the 2013 Games of the Small States of Europe were held from 28 to 30 May 2013 in Limpertsberg, Luxembourg.

Medal summary

Medal table

Men's events

Women's events

References

External links
 
 Site of the 2013 Games of the Small States of Europe
 Results book

European Games, Small States
2013 Games of the Small States of Europe
2013
2013 Europe Small States